Julio Solaun (born 1 February 1942) is a Spanish field hockey player. He competed at the 1964 Summer Olympics and the 1968 Summer Olympics. Also known as Javier, his great-niece Rocío Ybarra was captain of the Spain women's national field hockey team in the 2010s, and competed at three Olympics.

References

External links
 

1942 births
Living people
Spanish male field hockey players
Olympic field hockey players of Spain
Field hockey players at the 1964 Summer Olympics
Field hockey players at the 1968 Summer Olympics
Place of birth missing (living people)
Field hockey players from the Basque Country (autonomous community)